The 2012–13 New Orleans Hornets season was the 11th season of the franchise in the National Basketball Association (NBA). It was also the final season the New Orleans franchise played with the Hornets name; the team would change their name to the New Orleans Pelicans shortly after the conclusion of the regular season.

Key dates
May 30: The 2012 NBA Draft Lottery took place at Prudential Center in Newark, New Jersey. The New Orleans Hornets won the 1st and 10th overall picks in the draft.
June 28: The 2012 NBA draft took place at Prudential Center in Newark, New Jersey.

Draft picks

Roster

Pre-season

|- style="background:#cfc;"
| 1
| October 7
| Orlando
| 
| Brian Roberts (17)
| Davis & Anderson (8)
| Greivis Vásquez (6)
| Mexico City Arena18,133
| 1-0
|- style="background:#cfc;"
| 2
| October 9
| Charlotte
| 
| Anthony Davis (22)
| Robin Lopez (13)
| Greivis Vásquez (11)
| New Orleans Arena9,264
| 2–0
|- style="background:#cfc;"
| 3
| October 11
| @ Charlotte
| 
| Brian Roberts (16)
| Anthony Davis (9)
| Brian Roberts (8)
| North Charleston Coliseum-
| 3–0
|- style="background:#fcc;"
| 4
| October 12
| @ Houston
| 
| Al Farouq Aminu (15)
| Lopez & Thomas (8)
| Greivis Vásquez (5)
| Toyota Center10,718
| 3-1
|- style="background:#fcc;"
| 5
| October 18
| @ Atlanta
| 
| Anthony Davis (19)
| Davis & Anderson (7)
| Greivis Vásquez (7)
| Philips Arena8,563
| 3–2
|- style="background:#fcc;"
| 6
| October 22
| @ Dallas
| 
| Lopez & Anderson (14)
| Anthony Davis (17)
| Greivis Vásquez (5)
| American Airlines Center16,982
| 3-3
|- style="background:#fcc;"
| 7
| October 24
| Houston
| 
| Ryan Anderson (23)
| Davis, Lopez & Anderson (8)
| Greivis Vásquez (11)
| New Orleans Arena9,278
| 3-4
|- style="background:#cfc;"
| 8
| October 26
| @ Miami
| 
| Anthony Davis (24)
| Anthony Davis (11)
| Greivis Vásquez (10)
| American Airlines Arena19,600
| 4-4

Regular season

Game log

|- style="background:#fcc;"
| 1
| October 31
| San Antonio
| 
| Anthony Davis (21)
| Robin Lopez (9)
| Greivis Vásquez (13)
| New Orleans Arena15,358
| 0-1

|- style="background:#cfc;"
| 2
| November 2
| Utah
| 
| Anderson & Lopez (19)
| Al Farouq Aminu (8)
| Greivis Vásquez (10)
| New Orleans Arena14,147
| 1-1
|- style="background:#cfc;"
| 3
| November 3
| @ Chicago
| 
| Greivis Vásquez (18)
| Ryan Anderson (13)
| Greivis Vásquez (6)
| United Center21,758
| 2-1
|- style="background:#fcc;"
| 4
| November 7
| Philadelphia
| 
| Al Farouq Aminu (10)
| Al Farouq Aminu (16)
| Greivis Vásquez (7)
| New Orleans Arena12,988
| 2-2
|- style="background:#cfc;"
| 5
| November 9
| Charlotte
| 
| Ryan Anderson (25)
| Anthony Davis (11)
| Greivis Vásquez (8)
| New Orleans Arena12,668
| 3-2
|- style="background:#fcc;"
| 6
| November 14
| @ Houston
| 
| Greivis Vásquez (24)
| Ryan Anderson (12)
| Greivis Vásquez (9)
| Toyota Center14,535
| 3-3
|- style="background:#fcc;"
| 7
| November 16
| Oklahoma City
| 
| Ryan Anderson (15)
| Anthony Davis (11)
| Roberts & Vasquez (7)
| New Orleans Arena15,458
| 3-4
|- style="background:#fcc;"
| 8
| November 17
| @ Milwaukee
| 
| Anthony Davis (28)
| Anthony Davis (11)
| Greivis Vásquez (11)
| BMO Harris Bradley Center14,731
| 3-5
|- style="background:#fcc;"
| 9
| November 20
| New York
| 
| Ryan Anderson (15)
| Ryan Anderson (8)
| Greivis Vásquez (6)
| New Orleans Arena13,705
| 3-6
|- style="background:#fcc;"
| 10
| November 21
| @ Indiana
| 
| Robin Lopez (21)
| Robin Lopez (13)
| Greivis Vásquez (8)
| Bankers Life Fieldhouse12,633
| 3-7
|- style="background:#fcc;"
| 11
| November 23
| @ Phoenix
| 
| Ryan Anderson (34)
| Ryan Anderson (11)
| Greivis Vásquez (14)
| US Airways Center14,020
| 3-8
|- style="background:#fcc;"
| 12
| November 25
| @ Denver
| 
| Brian Roberts (17)
| Darius Miller (8)
| Rivers & Vasquez (6)
| Pepsi Center15,402
| 3-9
|- style="background:#cfc;"
| 13
| November 26
| @ L.A. Clippers
| 
| Greivis Vásquez (25)
| Aminu & Anderson (9)
| Greivis Vásquez (10)
| Staples Center19,060
| 4-9
|- style="background:#fcc;"
| 14
| November 28
| Utah
| 
| Lopez & Vasquez (18)
| Jason Smith (9)
| Greivis Vásquez (8)
| New Orleans Arena10,693
| 4-10

|- style="background:#fcc;"
| 15
| December 1
| Oklahoma City
| 
| Ryan Anderson (21)
| Ryan Anderson (10)
| Greivis Vásquez (7)
| New Orleans Arena14,547
| 4-11
|- style="background:#cfc;"
| 16
| December 3
| Milwaukee
| 
| Ryan Anderson (22)
| Ryan Anderson (7)
| Greivis Vásquez (9)
| New Orleans Arena12,321
| 5-11
|- style="background:#fcc;"
| 17
| December 5
| L.A. Lakers
| 
| Ryan Anderson (31)
| Al Farouq Aminu (10)
| Greivis Vásquez (9)
| New Orleans Arena18,449
| 5-12
|- style="background:#fcc;"
| 18
| December 7
| Memphis
| 
| Anderson, Rivers & Roberts (15)
| Jason Smith (5)
| Greivis Vásquez (8)
| New Orleans Arena13,698
| 5-13
|- style="background:#fcc;"
| 19
| December 8
| @ Miami
| 
| Ryan Anderson (24)
| Robin Lopez (8)
| Greivis Vásquez (7)
| American Airlines Arena19,600
| 5-14
|- style="background:#fcc;"
| 20
| December 11
| Washington
| 
| Ryan Anderson (17)
| Ryan Anderson (11)
| Greivis Vásquez (5)
| New Orleans Arena10,076
| 5-15
|- style="background:#fcc;"
| 21
| December 12
| @ Oklahoma City
| 
| Ryan Anderson (14)
| Robin Lopez (8)
| Anderson & Vásquez (5)
| Chesapeake Energy Arena18,203
| 5-16
|- style="background:#fcc;"
| 22
| December 14
| Minnesota
| 
| Austin Rivers (27)
| Al Farouq Aminu (8)
| Greivis Vásquez (17)
| New Orleans Arena14,671
| 5-17
|- style="background:#fcc;"
| 23
| December 16
| @ Portland
| 
| Ryan Anderson (26)
| Greivis Vásquez (8)
| Greivis Vásquez (11)
| Rose Garden18,772
| 5-18
|- style="background:#fcc;"
| 24
| December 18
| @ Golden State
| 
| Ryan Anderson (28)
| Anthony Davis (16)
| Greivis Vásquez (11)
| Oracle Arena19,596
| 5-19
|- style="background:#fcc;"
| 25
| December 19
| @ L.A. Clippers
| 
| Robin Lopez (22)
| Robin Lopez (9)
| Greivis Vásquez (10)
| Staples Center19,188
| 5-20
|- style="background:#fcc;"
| 26
| December 21
| @ San Antonio
| 
| Anthony Davis (18)
| Anthony Davis (11)
| Greivis Vásquez (4)
| AT&T Center17,943
| 5-21
|- style="background:#fcc;"
| 27
| December 22
| Indiana
| 
| Robin Lopez (24)
| Robin Lopez (11)
| Greivis Vásquez (8)
| New Orleans Arena15,042
| 5-22
|- style="background:#cfc;"
| 28
| December 26
| @ Orlando
| 
| Robin Lopez (29)
| Anthony Davis (11)
| Greivis Vásquez (8)
| Amway Center18,846
| 6-22
|- style="background:#fcc;"
| 29
| December 28
| Toronto
| 
| Anthony Davis (25)
| Ryan Anderson (12)
| Greivis Vásquez (14)
| New Orleans Arena13,968
| 6-23
|- style="background:#cfc;"
| 30
| December 29
| @ Charlotte
| 
| Eric Gordon (24)
| Anthony Davis (10)
| Greivis Vásquez (8)
| Time Warner Cable Arena18,110
| 7-23

|- style="background:#fcc;"
| 31
| January 1
| Atlanta
| 
| Ryan Anderson (23)
| Anthony Davis (13)
| Greivis Vásquez (10)
| New Orleans Arena12,712
| 7-24
|- style="background:#fcc;"
| 32
| January 2
| @ Houston
| 
| Ryan Anderson (18)
| Aminu & Lopez (8)
| Greivis Vásquez (14)
| Toyota Center18,198
| 7-25
|- style="background:#cfc;"
| 33
| January 5
| @ Dallas
| 
| Greivis Vásquez (25)
| Al Farouq Aminu (13)
| Greivis Vásquez (9)
| American Airlines Center20,338
| 8-25
|- style="background:#cfc;"
| 34
| January 7
| San Antonio
| 
| Eric Gordon (24)
| Al Farouq Aminu (10)
| Greivis Vásquez (11)
| New Orleans Arena11,599
| 9-25
|- style="background:#cfc;"
| 35
| January 9
| Houston
| 
| Mason Jr., Smith,& Vásquez (17)
| Aminu & Smith (10)
| Greivis Vásquez (11)
| New Orleans Arena11,453
| 10-25
|- style="background:#cfc;"
| 36
| January 11
| Minnesota
| 
| Greivis Vásquez (18)
| Al-Farouq Aminu (13)
| Greivis Vásquez (13)
| New Orleans Arena13,538
| 11-25
|- style="background:#fcc;"
| 37
| January 13
| @ New York
| 
| Eric Gordon (22)
| Al-Farouq Aminu (11)
| Greivis Vásquez (6)
| Madison Square Garden19,033
| 11-26
|- style="background:#cfc;"
| 38
| January 15
| @ Philadelphia
| 
| Greivis Vásquez (23)
| Ryan Anderson (9)
| Greivis Vásquez (9)
| Wells Fargo Center17,304
| 12-26
|- style="background:#cfc;"
| 39
| January 16
| @ Boston
| 
| Al-Farouq Aminu (18)
| Greivis Vásquez (11)
| Greivis Vásquez (4)
| TD Garden18,624
| 13-26
|- style="background:#fcc;"
| 40
| January 19
| Golden State
| 
| Eric Gordon (23)
| Anthony Davis (12)
| Greivis Vásquez (15)
| New Orleans Arena15,472
| 13-27
|- style="background:#cfc;"
| 41
| January 21
| Sacramento
| 
| Ryan Anderson (27)
| Al-Farouq Aminu (11)
| Greivis Vásquez (11)
| New Orleans Arena10,880
| 14-27
|- style="background:#fcc;"
| 42
| January 23
| @ San Antonio
| 
| Eric Gordon (17)
| Al-Farouq Aminu (12)
| Greivis Vásquez (11)
| AT&T Center17,511
| 14-28
|- style="background:#fcc;"
| 43
| January 25
| Houston
| 
| Eric Gordon (20)
| Anthony Davis (7)
| Greivis Vásquez (6)
| New Orleans Arena15,302
| 14-29
|- style="background:#cfc;"
| 44
| January 27
| @ Memphis
| 
| Ryan Anderson (22)
| Al-Farouq Aminu (12)
| Greivis Vásquez (11)
| FedExForum16,277
| 15-29
|- style="background:#fcc;"
| 45
| January 29
| @ L.A. Lakers
| 
| Eric Gordon (25)
| Robin Lopez (9)
| Greivis Vásquez (15)
| Staples Center18,997
| 15-30
|- style="background:#fcc;"
| 46
| January 30
| @ Utah
| 
| Greivis Vásquez (17)
| Al-Farouq Aminu (13)
| Greivis Vásquez (13)
| EnergySolutions Arena17,490
| 15-31

|- style="background:#fcc;"
| 47
| February 1
| @ Denver
| 
| Ryan Anderson (21)
| Anthony Davis (10)
| Greivis Vásquez (9)
| Pepsi Center17,221
| 15-32
|- style="background:#fcc;"
| 48
| February 2
| @ Minnesota
| 
| Anthony Davis (18)
| Greivis Vásquez (6)
| Greivis Vásquez (7)
| Target Center16,289
| 15-33
|- style="background:#cfc;"
| 49
| February 6
| Phoenix
| 
| Greivis Vásquez (19)
| Al-Farouq Aminu (11)
| Greivis Vásquez (12)
| New Orleans Arena12,148
| 16-33
|- style="background:#cfc;"
| 50
| February 8
| @ Atlanta
| 
| Eric Gordon (27)
| Greivis Vásquez (11)
| Greivis Vásquez (12)
| Philips Arena14,022
| 17-33
|- style="background:#fcc;"
| 51
| February 10
| @ Toronto
| 
| Robin Lopez (19)
| Greivis Vásquez (7)
| Greivis Vásquez (6)
| Air Canada Centre17,177
| 17-34
|- style="background:#cfc;"
| 52
| February 11
| @ Detroit
| 
| Ryan Anderson (31)
| Al-Farouq Aminu (14)
| Greivis Vásquez (13)
| The Palace of Auburn Hills10,177
| 18-34
|- style="background:#cfc;"
| 53
| February 13
| Portland
| 
| Anthony Davis (21)
| Anthony Davis (11)
| Greivis Vásquez (8)
| New Orleans Arena11,656
| 19-34
|- align="center"
|colspan="9" bgcolor="#bbcaff"|All-Star Break
|- style="background:#fcc;"
| 54
| February 19
| Chicago
| 
| Eric Gordon (20)
| Anthony Davis (10)
| Greivis Vásquez (10)
| New Orleans Arena13,612
| 19-35
|- style="background:#fcc;"
| 55
| February 20
| @ Cleveland
| 
| Brian Roberts (17)
| Al-Farouq Aminu (10)
| Greivis Vásquez (8)
| Quicken Loans Arena16,103
| 19-36
|- style="background:#fcc;"
| 56
| February 22
| Dallas
| 
| Eric Gordon (23)
| Ryan Anderson (12)
| Greivis Vásquez (11)
| New Orleans Arena16,538
| 19-37
|- style="background:#cfc;"
| 57
| February 24
| Sacramento
| 
| Anthony Davis (20)
| Ryan Anderson (9)
| Greivis Vásquez (13)
| New Orleans Arena12,788
| 20-37
|- style="background:#fcc;"
| 58
| February 26
| Brooklyn
| 
| Greivis Vásquez (20)
| Greivis Vásquez (8)
| Greivis Vásquez (7)
| New Orleans Arena12,651
| 20-38
|- style="background:#fcc;"
| 59
| February 27
| @ Oklahoma City
| 
| Ryan Anderson (14)
| Al-Farouq Aminu (7)
| Greivis Vásquez (7)
| Chesapeake Energy Arena18,203
| 20-39

|- style="background:#cfc;"
| 60
| March 1
| Detroit
| 
| Greivis Vásquez (25)
| Al-Farouq Aminu (14)
| Greivis Vásquez (9)
| New Orleans Arena14,189
| 21-39
|- style="background:#fcc;"
| 61
| March 4
| Orlando
| 
| Anthony Davis (17)
| Anthony Davis (15)
| Greivis Vásquez (8)
| New Orleans Arena11,050
| 21-40
|- style="background:#fcc;"
| 62
| March 6
| L.A. Lakers
| 
| Eric Gordon (18)
| Al-Farouq Aminu (16)
| Greivis Vásquez (12)
| New Orleans Arena16,019
| 21-41
|- style="background:#fcc;"
| 63
| March 9
| @ Memphis
| 
| Anthony Davis (20)
| Anthony Davis (18)
| Greivis Vásquez (8)
| FedEx Forum17,501
| 21-42
|- style="background:#cfc;"
| 64
| March 10
| Portland
| 
| Greivis Vásquez (20)
| Ryan Anderson (13)
| Brian Roberts (9)
| New Orleans Arena15,036
| 22-42
|- style="background:#fcc;"
| 65
| March 12
| @ Brooklyn
| 
| Eric Gordon (24)
| Anthony Davis (11)
| Greivis Vásquez (14)
| Barclays Center17,732
| 22-43
|- style="background:#fcc;"
| 66
| March 15
| @ Washington
| 
| Eric Gordon (20)
| Al-Farouq Aminu (8)
| Greivis Vásquez (9)
| Verizon Center14,942
| 22-44
|- style="background:#fcc;"
| 67
| March 17
| @ Minnesota
| 
| Greivis Vásquez (24)
| Robin Lopez (11)
| Greivis Vásquez (5)
| Target Center14,246
| 22-45
|- style="background:#fcc;"
| 68
| March 18
| Golden State
| 
| Ryan Anderson (21)
| Ryan Anderson (9)
| Greivis Vásquez (9)
| New Orleans Arena11,844
| 22-46
|- style="background:#cfc;"
| 69
| March 20
| Boston
| 
| Ryan Anderson (21)
| Al-Farouq Aminu (9)
| Greivis Vásquez (6)
| New Orleans Arena14,740
| 23-46
|- style="background:#cfc;"
| 70
| March 22
| Memphis
| 
| Robin Lopez (23)
| Anthony Davis (15)
| Greivis Vásquez (9)
| New Orleans Arena16,494
| 24-46
|- style="background:#cfc;"
| 71
| March 25
| Denver
| 
| Ryan Anderson (23)
| Ryan Anderson (9)
| Brian Roberts (18)
| New Orleans Arena11,185
| 25-46
|- style="background:#fcc;"
| 72
| March 27
| L.A. Clippers
| 
| Eric Gordon (24)
| Anthony Davis (9)
| Greivis Vásquez (4)
| New Orleans Arena15,128
| 25-47
|- style="background:#fcc;"
| 73
| March 29
| Miami
| 
| Ryan Anderson (20)
| Al-Farouq Aminu (16)
| Brian Roberts (5)
| New Orleans Arena18,647
| 25-48
|- style="background:#cfc;"
| 74
| March 31
| Cleveland
| 
| Greivis Vásquez (25)
| Anthony Davis (13)
| Greivis Vásquez (9)
| New Orleans Arena11,008
| 26-48

|- style="background:#fcc;"
| 75
| April 3
| @ Golden State
| 
| Eric Gordon (21)
| Anthony Davis (9)
| Greivis Vásquez (9)
| Oracle Arena19,596
| 26-49
|- style="background:#fcc;"
| 76
| April 5
| @ Utah
| 
| Anthony Davis (24)
| Anthony Davis (12)
| Greivis Vásquez (9)
| EnergySolutions Arena18,023
| 26-50
|- style="background:#cfc;"
| 77
| April 7
| @ Phoenix
| 
| Anthony Davis (20)
| Aminu & Anderson (10)
| Greivis Vásquez (7)
| US Airways Center16,780
| 27-50
|- style="background:#fcc;"
| 78
| April 9
| @ L.A. Lakers
| 
| Eric Gordon (22)
| Anthony Davis (14)
| Greivis Vásquez (9)
| Staples Center18,997
| 27-51
|- style="background:#fcc;"
| 79
| April 10
| @ Sacramento
| 
| Eric Gordon (23)
| Anthony Davis (10)
| Eric Gordon (7)
| Sleep Train Arena14,275
| 27-52
|- style="background:#fcc;"
| 80
| April 12
| L.A. Clippers
| 
| Eric Gordon (25)
| Robin Lopez (12)
| Brian Roberts (11)
| New Orleans Arena15,206
| 27-53
|- style="background:#fcc;"
| 81
| April 14
| Dallas
| 
| Ryan Anderson (20)
| Robin Lopez (13)
| Brian Roberts (6)
| New Orleans Arena17,246
| 27-54
|- style="background:#fcc;"
| 82
| April 17
| @ Dallas
| 
| Aminu & Gordon (16)
| Al-Farouq Aminu (20)
| Brian Roberts (6)
| American Airlines Center19,973
| 27-55

Standings

Transactions

Trades

Free agents

References

External links
2012–13 New Orleans Pelicans season at ESPN

New Orleans Hornets seasons
New Orleans Pelicans
Tar
Tar